Calligrapha multipunctata, the common willow calligrapha, is a species of leaf beetle in the family Chrysomelidae. It is found in North America.

Subspecies
These three subspecies have been assigned to the species Calligrapha multipunctata:
 Calligrapha multipunctata bigsbyana
 Calligrapha multipunctata multipunctata
 Calligrapha multipunctata suturella Schaeffer (which now may be considered a separate species)

References

Further reading

External links

 

Chrysomelinae
Articles created by Qbugbot
Beetles described in 1824